Maeve Jinkings (born 4 August 1976) is a Brazilian actress.

Early life 
Jinkings was born in Brasilia, Brazil's capital, the daughter of a merchant and a photojournalist. At the age of five she moved with her mother to Belém, Pará, where she grew up and graduated in Social Communication. When she was 22, she went to São Paulo to study drama at the CPT (Centro de Pesquisa Teatral -Center for Theater Research) headed by director Antunes Filho. She was also approved at EAD – Escola de Arte Dramática (School of Dramatic Arts) of the University of São Paulo.

She is of African-Brazilian descent, with some English ancestry from her maternal grandfather.

Career 
Jinkings' first experience in cinema was in the 2007 feature film ′′Falsa Loura′′ by Carlos Reichenbach. In 2009 she made a short film, Passageira S8º, in Recife. Her breakout was in 2011, with Neighbouring Sounds, directed by Kleber Mendonça Filho. She would work with Mendonça Filho again in Aquarius. With the 2012 production Amor Plástico e Barulho, she won the Best Actress Award in the 46th Festival de Brasília and the Brazilian Film Festival of Toronto. Jinkings also worked as a casting associate in the films Sem Coração and Big Jato.

Her debut on television was in 2015, in the Rede Globo telenovela A Regra do Jogo.

Filmography

Cinema

Television

References

External links 
 Official site
 

1976 births
Living people
People from Brasília
Afro-Brazilian actresses
Brazilian people of English descent
Brazilian film actresses
Brazilian television actresses
People from Belém
21st-century Brazilian actresses